Abū al-Qāsim ibn Firruh ibn Khalaf ibn Aḥmad al-Ruʿaynī al-Shāṭibī, 538–590 AH / 1144–1194 CE, was an Islamic scholar from Játiva (Spain) who worked in the field of  (Quran recitation methods).

Life and works
Al-Shatibi was born in 538 AH in al-Andalus (Muslim Spain).  He moved to Egypt in 574 AH where he died on 22 Jumada al-Thani 590 AH. He authored Ḥirz al-amānī wa-wajh al-tahānī, commonly known as Matn al-Shāṭibīyah. The Pakistani scholar Fateh Muhammad Panipati wrote a commentary on it entitled Inayate Rahmani. His other books include:
 Aqīlat atrāb al-qaṣāʼid fī asná al-maqāṣid
 Nāzimatuz-zuhr
 Qasīdah Dāliyah

References

Citations

Sources

Further reading

1144 births
1194 deaths
12th-century Muslim theologians
12th-century writers from al-Andalus
Maliki scholars from al-Andalus
People from the Almohad Caliphate